Randolph Cemetery is a historic  cemetery for African-Americans in  Columbia, South Carolina. It was established in 1872 and expanded in 1899.  It was named for Benjamin F. Randolph (1820–1868), who was reburied at the cemetery in 1871. Randolph was a militia leader protecting African Americans when he was assassinated. A memorial in his honor and for other African-American leaders killed was erected. Gravemarkers include both manufactured and vernacular homemade varieties. The cemetery holds eight Reconstruction Era state legislators. It was added to the National Register of Historic Places in 1995.

History
Randolph Cemetery was established as the first cemetery for Columbia's African-American population (up until then, African-Americans has been buried in the local potter's field called Lower Cemetery between the river and the current Randolph Cemetery). The cemetery initially consisted of three acres purchased from Elmwood Cemetery in 1872. An additional acre was purchased in 1899. Today it spans about six acres. But how those additional two acres were acquired is not clear.

The cemetery fell into decline as the descendants of those interred and the owners of the remaining plots moved away, many as part of the Great Migration. The area became wilderness by the middle of the 20th century.

The city of Columbia began to clear it out with bulldozers as part of its urban renewal program in 1959, but the clearing was halted when Minnie Simons Williams, a local resident, drew the city's attention to the historical significance of the cemetery. Williams, along with descendants of the founders of the cemetery, reestablished the Randolph Cemetery Association and were given (through a legal suit) stewardship of the cemetery. The association has organized donations and volunteers to restore and maintain the cemetery.

Notable burials
 Henry Cardozo (1830–1886), state senator
 George Elmore (South Carolina), businessman who challenged South Carolina's whites-only Democratic Party primary system
 William Fabriel Myers (1850–1917), state senator
 William Beverly Nash (1822–1888), state senator
 Robert John Palmer (1849–1928), state representative
 Benjamin Franklin Randolph (d 1868) state senator
 William Simons (d 1878), state representative
 Samuel Benjamin Thompson (1837–1909), state representative
 Charles McDuffie Wilder (1835–1902), postmaster and city council member in Columbia, South Carolina
 Lucius Wimbush (1839–1872), state senator

References

External links
 

African-American history of South Carolina
Cemeteries on the National Register of Historic Places in South Carolina
1872 establishments in South Carolina
Buildings and structures in Columbia, South Carolina
National Register of Historic Places in Columbia, South Carolina